Cameron Dean Fletcher (born 1 March 1993) is a New Zealand cricketer who plays for Canterbury.

Early life

Cameron Fletcher was born in Auckland, New Zealand. As a teenager he attended Kelston Boys' High School.

Domestic career
Fletcher began his domestic career with Northern Districts, making his First-class and List A debuts for them in February 2013.

Fletcher was then awarded a contract to play for Canterbury for the 2014–15 season.

In March 2018, in the 2017–18 Plunket Shield season, he scored his maiden century in first-class cricket. In June 2018, he was awarded a contract with Canterbury for the 2018–19 season. In June 2020, he was offered a contract by Canterbury ahead of the 2020–21 domestic cricket season.

International career

New Zealand Under-19
In 2012, Fletcher was named in the New Zealand Under-19 squad, alongside future Black Caps Will Young, Ish Sodhi and Jacob Duffy. The squad went to Australia for both a quadrangular series against England, India and the hosts, and the Under-19 World Cup. He scored 49 in a last-ball victory over the West Indies in the quarter finals, and 53 as New Zealand were beaten by India in the semi-finals.

New Zealand
In February 2022, Fletcher was named in New Zealand's Test squad for their series against South Africa. In May 2022, Fletcher was named in New Zealand's Test squad for their tour of England.

New Zealand A

In August 2022, Fletcher was named in the New Zealand A squad to tour India.

References

External links
 

1993 births
Living people
New Zealand cricketers
Canterbury cricketers
Northern Districts cricketers
Cricketers from Auckland